Two human polls comprised the 1981 National Collegiate Athletic Association (NCAA) Division I-A football rankings. Unlike most sports, college football's governing body, the NCAA, does not bestow a national championship, instead that title is bestowed by one or more different polling agencies. There are two main weekly polls that begin in the preseason—the AP Poll and the Coaches Poll.

Legend

AP Poll

Coaches Poll
Arizona State, SMU, and Miami (FL) (after a November 3, 1981 ruling) were on probation by the NCAA during the 1981 season; they were therefore ineligible to receive votes in the Coaches Poll.

References

NCAA Division I FBS football rankings